The Way of Shadows is a 2008 fantasy novel written by Brent Weeks and is the first novel in The Night Angel Trilogy.

Setting
The story takes place in Cenaria City, the capital of the Kingdom of Cenaria. Cenaria is on a fictional continent called Midcyru. It begins in the city's lawless slum sector, known as the Warrens, then expands to the East Side, home to the middle and upper classes. Cenaria is a monarchy, with a king and dynastic succession. Behind the throne however is a mysterious criminal council, the Sa'Kage (Lords of the Shadows), controlling criminal activity and trade while manipulating the king and the succession through extortion and assassination.

Cenaria is a politically and militarily insignificant country. To its north lies the aggressive, brutal land of Khalidor with its tyrannical Godking, and to the south is the wealthier Ceura. Cenaria has remained independent of Khalidor because of its poverty and problematic geography, but Khalidor has plans to conquer it.

Plot summary
Azoth is an orphan who lives in the Warrens of Cenaria City. He and his two friends, Jarl and 'Doll Girl', are members of the Black Dragon Guild. They make their living stealing money to buy food and pay their guild dues to Rat, the Guild Fist, an enforcer who beats or rapes anyone who doesn't pay. One night, Azoth overhears a confrontation between Durzo Blint, the best wetboy (magically endowed and highly trained assassins) in the city, and several unknown assailants. After Durzo slaughters the assassins, he catches the escaping Azoth and tells him to not say a word about what he has seen to anyone.

Jarl gives Azoth money that he'd saved so that he can be Durzo Blint's apprentice. Azoth follows Durzo after an ambush during a contract at the Black Dragon's guild to present his offer for apprenticeship. Durzo declines his offer and disappears. Rat beats and rapes Jarl which prompts Azoth to rally other members of the guild to stand up to him. Azoth encounters Durzo again and threatens to kill him unless he apprentices him. Durzo agrees on the condition that Azoth kill Rat by the end of the week.

Before Azoth can kill Rat, Rat kidnaps and beats Doll Girl, leaving her with ugly scars all over her face. Durzo finds Doll Girl, and Azoth pleads with him to save her. Durzo agrees and Azoth sets out to kill Rat. Azoth kills Rat and cuts off his ear as proof to take back to Durzo, who has followed through and saved Doll Girl's life.

Elsewhere in Cenaria, eleven-year-old Logan Gyre watches his father, Duke Regnus Gyre, as he prepares to travel to a garrison called Screaming Winds on Cenaria's border with Khalidor. Logan asks to go with his father, but Duke Gyre refuses and leaves his son as the Lord of House Gyre.

A traveling mage from the Empire of Sethi, Solon Tofusin, arrives at the Gyre estate. He is on a mission from the prophet Dorian to help Lord Gyre. When he finds out Duke Gyre has gone to Screaming Winds, he plans to head there immediately, but his plans are disrupted when he finds out that Logan has also been named Lord Gyre. Logan forces him to spar, and Solon humiliates him. He tells him that Logan's soldiers have been losing to him on purpose, which infuriates Logan. He tells his men to treat him as no more than an equal; he is soon going to join his father at Screaming Winds, and if they truly love him, they should be preparing him for the battles there. He apologizes to Solon, who is impressed with Logan and decides to stay with him for now. Solon offends Logan's mother and she tries to send him away, but Logan reminds her he is now Lord Gyre and sends her away instead. Solon is even more impressed with Logan, and becomes less certain that Duke Gyre is the one he must serve.

Azoth begins his training with Durzo, which carries on for several years. As well as his wetboy training, Azoth learns to read from Gwinvere Kirena (Momma K as she is more widely known), a member of the Sa'kage who manages the brothels in Cenaria City who is also the older sister to Durzo's deceased former lover, Vonda. From her, Azoth learns that Durzo allowed Vonda to die at the hands of the Khalidorans in order to keep a ka'kari, an ancient item that grants immense magical power, from Garoth Ursuul, the so-called Godking of Khalidor. Azoth excels in his training but is unable to awaken his "talent," his magical ability and is forced to leave his lodgings at Durzo's hideout after Brant Agon, the chief general to Cenaria's king, attempts to blackmail Durzo into the king's service. He is sent to live with Count Rimbold Drake, who is to give him a new name, Kylar Stern, and teach him to behave in noble society. During this time, Kylar and Logan become acquainted and soon become fast friends. Additionally, Jarl also comes under Momma K's protection, becoming her right hand man in operating Cenaria City's brothels.

Much later while fighting disguised on behalf of the Sa'Kage in a tourney, Kylar encounters a former sister of the Chantry, an all-female organization of mages, who tells him that the reason he can't awaken his Talent is that he has no "conduit" to let it out, although in fact the power for magic in him (his glore vyrden) is enormous.

Durzo seeks a way for Kylar to be able to use his Talent. With the silver kakari rumoured to be in the city, Kylar is told to get into a party hosted by a powerful noble in order to steal it. Later on, Kylar encounters Dorian who tells Kylar to "ask Momma K" and that "a square vase will give you hope." Momma K tells him that she has someone who may be able to get him in. When he goes to visit this person, it turns out to be Doll Girl, now called Elene Cromwell. After Durzo saved her, Kylar had asked Count Drake to give her a good home and she was adopted by the Cromwell family. Kylar has since acted as her patron, sending money and occasionally checking up on her in secret. Despite a tearful and loving reunion, she denies him an invitation due to her obligations as a servant. Kylar finds another way in and starts a fight with Logan (at Logan's bidding to impress Count Drake's eldest daughter whom Logan wishes to marry, but whom loves Kylar) as a distraction so he can look around.

Around this time, a former member of the Black Dragons named Roth has begun to rise in prominence among the Sa'kage. During a meeting with Momma K, he threatens her with information that he has her daughter, Ulyssandra (nicknamed Uly), and thus coerces her into doing his bidding. At the same time, Durzo, who believes Uly to be his daughter by Vonda, takes this information from Momma K in a vicious argument. This embitters her against Durzo while he is unaware that Uly is in fact Momma K's daughter by him (conceived during a drug-addled fling with her many years prior)

Kylar comes to the conclusion that Elene must have the kakari. He goes to her room where he finds the kakari and ends up knocking Elene out to save himself from having to kill her. Durzo finds him in her room and they find out that the silver kakari is a fake. However, Kylar instead ends up with the black kakari, the original ka'kari which was believed to be a myth, which he unknowingly steals from Durzo. The heir to the throne, Prince Aleine, is killed that night by the hostess, Lady Jadwin, who is in the service of Khalidor while a wetboy named Hu Gibbet, Durzo's sadistic rival, also kills most of the Gyre household, including Logan's mother, leaving Regnus, recently returned from the border, to discover the massacre. Logan is blamed for the murder of Prince Aleine  and is taken into custody, but is soon released by the Queen, his mother's older sister from the powerful Graesin family and his father's former betrothed. She convinces him to marry her daughter, Jenine, both as part of his bail condition, but also to preserve the family of the man she loved and to protect Cenaria from Khalidor.

The King then publicly, while in a fit of drunkenness, announces the marriage between Jenine and Logan to secure the line of succession and an heir in case of his own death. During the ceremony Durzo, who is working for Roth, now revealed to be a son of Garoth Ursuul, in order to save his daughter, poisons almost everyone in the King's court. Meanwhile, Roth and Neph Dada, a high ranking Khalidoran vurdmeister (users of the parasitic magic known as the vir) attack the castle, during which Regnus, the Queen and her children are all killed. Khalidorans arrive by sea with vurdmeisters but Kylar slows down the process by burning some ships and killing a number of the elite Khalidoran highlanders. Amidst the panic, General Agon beheads the king so that the remaining knights will focus on saving the new king, Logan, who is in his bed chambers preparing to consummate his marriage to Jenine. However, Roth kills the knights and forces his way into Logan's room. Roth apparently kills Jenine, but Neph secretly preserves her for the Godking, who is on his way. Roth then orders Logan to be castrated and fed to the holers, the lowest members of the massive Cenarian gaol known as the Maw.

Jarl has hired a guard to save Logan from being killed, but this fails so to save his life, Logan takes a knife and jumps into the hole of cannibalistic prisoners. Durzo is forced to fight Kylar so that he can unbind the Black Kakari and give it to Roth to save his daughter. Kylar bests him in the end and Durzo's dying wish is for Kylar to save his daughter, along with an apology for all he has done wrong. Following the fight, Kylar fully takes on the mantle of the Night Angel, the avatar of justice, mercy and retribution, a role formerly held by Durzo who is revealed to be Acaelus Thorne, a legendary hero from Midcyru's past. Along with the ka'kari, Kylar also takes Durzo's magical sword, Retribution, and sets off to save Logan.  Kylar, as the Night Angel, helps release some prisoners from the Maw while rescuing Elene and Uly who had been captured. After hearing of Logan's location, he heads to the bedchamber where he finds nothing but blood and thus believes Logan has been killed.

Kylar later poisons Momma K, but also grants her the antidote out of mercy then comes face to face with Roth who is surrounded by vurdmeisters. Roth reveals himself as Rat, who had survived the earlier attempt on his life. Solon arrives outside with Curoch, the ancient magical sword that once belonged to Midcyru's first emperor, Jorsin Alkestes, and uses it to slay a large group of vurdmeisters. Kylar kills all of Roth's guard and eventually Roth himself, but dies in the process. While in the state of death, Kylar meets a mysterious figure known as the Wolf and is given the choice of an immortal life as the Night Angel or death in either heaven or hell. He chooses Elene and life and is revived. Kylar and Elene make up and decide to try for a life together along with Uly whom they adopt. While Roth was killed, his army successfully took over the castle and the city, allowing his father to conquer Cenaria, forcing Kylar, Elene and Uly to leave the country.

Awards and nominations

David Gemmell's Legend Award (Finalist)

Publication history
2008, United States, Orbit 0316033677, October 2008, Mass Market Paperback

References 

Weeks, Brent. The Way of Shadows, New York. Orbit Books. pp. 688.

External links 
 Official Homepage of the Night Angel Trilogy
 Orbit Books (Publisher)

2008 American novels
American fantasy novels
Novels by Brent Weeks
Orbit Books books